is a Japanese ice hockey player. Her position is defense and she shoots left. She has played for Japan constantly in World Championships since 2000, when she made her first national team appearance while still in junior high school.

Currently she plays for Kamori Kankou Bears.

Stats:

References

1984 births
Japanese women's ice hockey defencemen
Living people
Asian Games medalists in ice hockey
Ice hockey players at the 2007 Asian Winter Games
Medalists at the 2007 Asian Winter Games
Asian Games silver medalists for Japan